Dunmore is a rural locality in the Toowoomba Region, Queensland, Australia.

History 
The locality takes its name from the parish name, which in turn was named after the pastoral run held by Robert Logan in the 1840s. The run might have been named in honour of Presbyeterian minister John Dunmore Lang.

References 

Toowoomba Region
Localities in Queensland